Woodbury is an unincorporated community in Vernon Township, Hancock County, Indiana.

History
Woodbury was laid out and platted in 1851 by Ellen Wood. A post office was established at Woodbury in 1858, and remained in operation until it was discontinued in 1903.

Geography

References

Unincorporated communities in Hancock County, Indiana
Unincorporated communities in Indiana
Indianapolis metropolitan area